They Never Looked Inside is the second novel by the British mystery writer Michael Gilbert. It was published in England by Hodder and Stoughton in 1948 and in the United States by Harper & Brothers in 1949 as He Didn't Mind Danger. It was Gilbert's first publication in the States. It is also the second novel to feature Gilbert's earliest recurring character, Inspector Hazlerigg. Gilbert, who was appointed CBE in 1980, was a founder-member of the British Crime Writers' Association. The Mystery Writers of America named him a Grand Master in 1988 and in 1990 he was presented Bouchercon's Lifetime Achievement Award.

Plot and title(s) 
The events take place mostly in post-World War II London, in either 1945 and '46 or 1946 and '47—it is difficult to put an exact date on them—and in one extended scene  in France. They are told by an omniscient third-person narrator but most of the scenes involve either Inspector Hazlerigg and the workings of the Metropolitan police department or the activities of a recently mustered-out Army veteran, Major Angus McMann. It was the first of a number of novels Gilbert would write over his exceptionally long career in which organized gangs and criminal masterminds figure, both in London and, less often, in Europe.
The war has ended but a large number of British troops are still stationed in Europe. Adapting the techniques and brutality of pre-war American gangs, a British crime leader who keeps his identity unknown by his ingenious use of middlemen has organized both ordinary criminal figures and newly discharged British soldiers into a profitable scheme involving both burglaries and currency smuggling. Gold and jewelry are stolen throughout England; some is smuggled to Europe by British soldiers returning to the Continent from leave. Some is melted down and recast as counterfeit gold sovereigns, which are in great demand throughout Europe and can be sold for immense profits. Other British soldiers are also being used to smuggle valuable jewelry from Europe into England, where it can be sold profitably. It is this organization that Hazlerigg and his counterparts in France and Italy have been desperately trying to shut down. Major McMann, now living temporarily at his elderly sister's home, tells Hazlerigg at their initial meeting, "I'm at a loose end. I live in London, and I don't mind work." And, as the author adds, "He didn't mind danger, either, but he didn't say so." The British title of the book is apparently derived from the fact that the British soldiers who ferry jewels and sovereigns back and forth across the Channel do so with such ingeniously crafted items as false-bottomed canteens that they never looked inside them.

Reception
Upon its publication in the United States Anthony Boucher, the mystery critic of the New York Times, called it "a convincing and warmly realistic suspense story," and added that it was "a first novel to make you look forward hopefully to more Michael Gilbert." A few years later, however, although still admiring it, he said it was "a Manning Coles novel of blithe adventure" By the time he wrote this, Coles had cemented his reputation for writing rather light-hearted suspense/espionage novels involving somewhat implausible escapes from danger by his on-going hero, Tommy Hambledon.

Style and contents

The style is, in actuality, a combination of both the tones that Boucher mentions. Gilbert, still a relatively inexperienced writer, had not yet found the authorial voice he would later use so successfully for many years, a style that was spare and unadorned but was also urbane and straightforward, mixing occasional ironic humor with a surprising amount of underlying grimness. Gilbert had attended Blundell's School, a notable British public school, and after graduating from college was a schoolmaster in a prep school for a while before the war. A number of his books and stories are set in boys' schools and, unusually for a crime writer, he frequently has teenage boys as important characters in many of his works. In this novel several of them have roles, this time as part of the criminal underground, although they are mostly older than the somewhat younger boys that Gilbert normally depicts.

Credibility

As in many crime or mystery stories, the likelihood of some of the events in the narrative cannot withstand prolonged scrutiny. Aside from the somewhat unlikely amateur sleuthing by various friends of Major McMann that brings to light important leads overlooked by the best minds of Scotland Yard, it also strains credibility that the sinister "Mr. Brown", the secretive mastermind who directs an enormous criminal enterprise, both in England and abroad, and who has hitherto shown utter ruthlessness in dispatching both suspected informers and police spies within his organization, going so far as to personally torture and kill the undercover policeman Sergeant Pollock, first captures, and then releases, Major McMann when it is obvious that McMann has been tracking one of his underlings. Held in circumstances that make escape clearly impossible, McMann is not even interrogated by Mr. Brown; instead, he is simply released because a low-ranking member of the gang, who had served in the Army directly under McMann, vouches for him. Otherwise, Gilbert's description of the organization and ruthlessness of the gang seems grimly realistic and quite feasible. And, in the end, it is the enormous organizational firepower of government forces, not the doings of a gifted amateur, that eventually brings Mr. Brown to justice.

Notes

External links

1948 British novels
Hodder & Stoughton books
British mystery novels
Novels by Michael Gilbert